Kharij, sometimes translated as The Case is Closed, is a 1982 Bengali film by Mrinal Sen under the banner of Neelkanth Films. It is based on a novel by Ramapada Chowdhury.The film was hit at the box-office.

Plot
The movie tells the story of a middle-class family whose child servant, Palan is found dead in their kitchen, and their efforts to pacify his grieving father.

Cast
 Anjan Dutt as Anjan Sen
 Mamata Shankar as Mamata Sen
 Sreela Majumdar as Sreeja
 Gita Sen as Helpful neighbor
 Sunil Mukherjee as Curious neighborhood onlooker
 Indranil Moitra as Pupai
 Dehapratim Das Gupta as Hari
 Nilotpal Dey as Inspector
 Charuprakash Ghosh as Lawyer
 Debatosh Ghosh

Awards
 1983:Golden Palm: 1983 Cannes Film Festival: Mrinal Sen: Nominated 
 1983:Jury Prize: 1983 Cannes Film Festival: Mrinal Sen.
 1983:Second Best Feature Film: National Film Award:Mrinal Sen
 1983:Best Screenplay:National Film Award:Mrinal Sen
 1983:Best Art Direction:National Film Award:Nitish Roy
 1983: Golden Spike:Valladolid International Film Festival.

References

External links 
 

1982 films
1982 drama films
Bengali-language Indian films
Films directed by Mrinal Sen
Films set in Kolkata
Films whose production designer won the Best Production Design National Film Award
Films whose writer won the Best Original Screenplay National Film Award
Second Best Feature Film National Film Award winners
1980s Bengali-language films
Films based on works by Ramapada Chowdhury